Abinsky (masculine), Abinskaya (feminine), or Abinskoye may refer to:
Abinsky District, a district of Krasnodar Krai, Russia
Abinskoye Urban Settlement, a municipal formation which the Town of Abinsk in Abinsky District of Krasnodar Krai, Russia is incorporated as
Abinsky, name of the town of Abinsk in Krasnodar Krai, Russia before 1963